Vahid Selimović (born 3 April 1997) is a Luxembourgish professional footballer who plays as a centre-back for Slovenian PrvaLiga club Gorica.

Born in Luxembourg, Selimović was a youth international for Serbia, but represents the Luxembourg national football team at the senior level.

Club career
Selimović joined the Metz academy at the age of 8 in 2005, and spent his entire youth years with them, signing his first professional contract eleven years later on 4 July 2016. Selimović made his professional debut for Metz in a 1–0 Coupe de la Ligue loss to Angers SCO on 12 December 2017. He made his Ligue 1 debut in a 3–1 win over Montpellier HSC on 16 December 2017.

In January 2019, he signed a two-year contract with Apollon Limassol.

On 8 August 2020, it was announced that Selimović had moved to OFI in Greece.

International career
Selimović was born in Luxembourg and is of Bosniak origin. He made his debut for the Serbian under-19 team in a friendly 2–0 win over the Bulgaria U19s.

Selimović switched his national allegiance to Luxembourg in 2019, receiving his first call-up for the senior matches in June of that year.

Career statistics

International
Scores and results list Luxembourg's goal tally first, score column indicates score after each Selimović goal.

References

External links
 
 
 
 FC Metz profile

1997 births
Living people
Sportspeople from Luxembourg City
Association football defenders
Luxembourgian footballers
Luxembourg international footballers
Serbian footballers
Serbia youth international footballers
Luxembourgian people of Serbian descent
Luxembourgian people of Bosnia and Herzegovina descent
Bosniaks of Serbia
FC Metz players
Apollon Limassol FC players
OFI Crete F.C. players
ND Gorica players
Championnat National 2 players
Championnat National 3 players
Ligue 1 players
Cypriot First Division players
Super League Greece players

Serbian expatriate footballers
Serbian expatriate sportspeople in France
Serbian expatriate sportspeople in Cyprus
Luxembourgian expatriate footballers
Luxembourgian expatriate sportspeople in France
Luxembourgian expatriate sportspeople in Cyprus
Luxembourgian expatriate sportspeople in Greece
Expatriate footballers in France
Expatriate footballers in Cyprus
Expatriate footballers in Greece
Expatriate footballers in Slovenia